Bob's Burgers is an American animated sitcom created by Loren Bouchard that began airing on Fox on January 9, 2011. It centers on the Belcher family—parents Bob and Linda and their three children, Tina, Gene, and Louise—who run a hamburger restaurant and often go on adventures of many kinds. The series was conceived by Bouchard after he developed Home Movies. Bob's Burgers is a joint production by Wilo Productions and 20th Television Animation.

While reviews for the first season were mixed, feedback for subsequent seasons has been much more positive. The series premiere, "Human Flesh", drew in 9.39 million viewers, making it the highest-rated series premiere of the season and finishing ninth in the ratings for the week it aired. Since then, the series has grown to be a critical and cultural success. In 2013, TV Guide ranked Bob's Burgers as one of the 60 Greatest TV Cartoons of All Time. The series has been nominated for several awards, including the Emmy Award for Outstanding Animated Program eleven consecutive times (2012–2022), winning in 2014 and 2017. Reruns began airing on Cartoon Network's late-night programming block Adult Swim on June 23, 2013 and its sister channel TBS in 2016, and began airing in syndication on local stations in September 2015.

A comic book series based on the series, published by Dynamite Entertainment, began in September 2014. A soundtrack album was released on Sub Pop Records on May 12, 2017, with a second volume released on August 20, 2021.

The series has been renewed for its fourteenth and fifteenth production cycles. In addition, a feature film was released in theatres on May 27, 2022.

Premise
The animated series centers on the Belcher family—which consists of Bob, his wife Linda, and their children Tina, Gene, and Louise. The family runs a burger restaurant on Ocean Avenue in an unnamed seaside community (informally known as "Seymour's Bay" among the series' writing staff). Episodes typically follow the family's experiences running the restaurant, interacting with the eccentric members of their community, and navigating being a working-class family and business owners.

Episodes will sometimes involve a single storyline involving all of the Belchers, or will have two simultaneous stories for different groups of the family. The family members interact with many recurring characters who are also residents of the town. Bob's Burgers has a few regulars—most frequently Mort from the neighboring crematorium and handyman Teddy. The restaurant has to compete with several other local eateries for business. His biggest rival is Jimmy Pesto, who owns an Italian restaurant called "Jimmy Pesto's Pizzeria," which is located directly across the street and is generally more successful, creating tension between the two owners.

Bob's Burgers is located in a green two-story building which features an apartment on the second floor where the Belcher family lives. The restaurant is sandwiched between two other commercial buildings, one of which houses "It's Your Funeral Home and Crematorium". As a running gag, the other building is shown in the opening credits to be a new business each week, often with names which are elaborate puns.

As well as assisting in the restaurant, the Belcher children all attend Wagstaff School. Several episode plot lines involve the children's escapades in and out of school. Thirteen-year-old Tina, at the beginning of adolescence, struggles with her attraction to boys. The most common target for her affections is Pesto's eldest son, Jimmy Pesto Jr. Eleven-year-old Gene strives to be a musician, very often carrying a keyboard and noodling with it. Nine-year-old Louise is the scheming troublemaker, seeking revenge, riches, or adventure, often dragging her siblings along; she puts on a face of fearlessness but is still afraid of some things (such as the dentist).

Bob's Burgers makes occasional use of musical numbers. The closing sequence uses different soundtracks each episode. From season two, a different animation played alongside the credits.

Episodes

Characters

Main characters 

The Belcher family runs a hamburger restaurant. Despite routinely cycling through the seasons, the characters remain perpetually the same age. 

 Bob Belcher (H. Jon Benjamin) is the titular protagonist of the series and owner of "Bob's Burgers". He is the husband to Linda and father to Tina, Gene, and Louise. He is a second-generation restaurateur and is 46 years old. Bob was born to Lily and Robert "Big Bob" Belcher Sr., who ran a diner called "Big Bob's Diner". Bob had a relatively unhappy childhood as his mother died when he was young and his father was an alcoholic who forced Bob to constantly work. His father is also known to never smile, and holds resentment for Bob leaving and starting his own business. Bob is the more sensible one of his family, though he is not afraid to get petty and is often stubborn and exasperated. Despite his somewhat pessimistic personality, he loves and cares for his family, as well as for his restaurant and Burgers of the Day. Like the rest of his family, Bob has black hair, tanned skin, and dark eyes. He is a fan of foreign films.
 Linda Belcher (John Roberts) is one of the main protagonists of the series, wife to Bob and mother to Tina, Gene, and Louise. She is 44 years old, always wears signature red glasses, and speaks with a thick, heavily pronounced New Jersey / New York Area accent. Linda is fun-loving and happy-go-lucky, a positive contrast to her husband's pessimism. She is generally laid back and extra enthusiastic in whatever she does, often bursting into made-up songs about everyday things. Linda is shown to be very supportive, such as encouraging Tina to write "erotic friend-fiction" or supporting her sister Gayle in her many questionable business ideas and hobbies. However, Linda can be strict as well, showing less leniency when Louise does not listen to her. Linda frequently winds up in comedic situations trying to prove herself to be a loving wife and mother. 
 Tina Belcher (Dan Mintz) is the eldest of the three Belcher children. She is socially awkward, insecure, and tends to freeze up and produce a long groaning sound when faced with decisions or conflict. However, there are moments when she gathers courage and acts impulsively too. Like a lot of 13-year-old girls, she fantasizes about boys and has many crushes, also obsessing over boy bands like "Boyz 4 Now". She likes horses, rainbows, buttocks, zombies, writing erotic fiction, and writing in her journal about everything. Throughout the series, Tina has a constant crush on Jimmy Jr. – the son of Bob's rival Jimmy Pesto – who vacillates between reciprocating and rejecting Tina's affections. She is a hopeless romantic and writes various fanfiction about Jimmy Jr. and her life. She struggles to find her place within her school group, which typically consists of Jimmy Jr, his best friend Zeke, and Tina’s social rivals Tammy and Jocelyn. Out of the three siblings, Tina is arguably the most responsible, although Gene and Louise take advantage of her innocence and naivety. Like everyone else in her family, Tina has black hair and tanned skin. She always wears thick black glasses that magnify her eyes, and a yellow barrette in her hair.
 Gene Belcher (Eugene Mirman) is the middle child and the only son. Like his mother, Gene is carefree and friendly, but strikes a close resemblance to his father, especially when Bob was his age. Gene enjoys pestering everyone around him by using sound effects with either his Casio SK-5 keyboard or his megaphone. He frequently records flatulence sounds and uses them as sound effects and additions to his music. He is close to everyone in his family, especially Louise, often helping her with schemes and relating to her on a mature level, as well as Linda whom he has an affectionate relationship with. Gene is shown to have a passion for music, he writes songs and fantasizes about his future in the music industry. Despite being only 11, he has written at least one full musical as well as many other songs with topics ranging from flatulence to Thanksgiving.
 Louise Belcher (Kristen Schaal), the youngest Belcher at 9 years old, is a schemer with a mischievous and cynical personality. She often yells in excitement or anger, and she knows how to manipulate people in order to get her way. Though her intentions in the series consistently appear to be dubious, she is often portrayed as a reluctant antihero. She is also narcissistic in nature and will go to drastic lengths to achieve her aims. Louise is fiercely protective of, and has a deep affection for, her family, though she displays her feelings towards each in different fashion. She looks up to her father and enjoys bonding with him over games and movies; she has been revealed to see her future in the restaurant. Still, she will take advantage of her family when it suits her. Her relationship with her mother is more complex; she has a close resemblance to Linda but is more likely to disobey her than Bob. Louise always wears a pink hat with long bunny ears, never showing her uncovered head even as a baby. She has her own group of friends that she sees herself as the ringleader of, including the Pesto twins Andy and Ollie, the asthmatic and chronically monikered “Regular Sized” Rudy, and Darryl.
 Teddy (Larry Murphy), a bumbling but kind handyman who eats at the restaurant regularly. He regards Bob as his best friend, a sentiment Bob begrudgingly reciprocates, and admires the Belcher family dynamic. Chronically unlucky in love, he particularly admires Bob and Linda’s marriage, and frequently joins the Belchers in their schemes.

Recurring characters 
There are various recurring characters in the series, including Jimmy Pesto Sr. (Jay Johnston, 2011–2021), Bob's primary business rival who owns an Italian-themed restaurant across the street with his friend Trev, and his three sons: Jimmy Jr. (Benjamin), Tina's somewhat oblivious love interest who just wants to dance; and hyperactive and childish twins Andy (Laura Silverman) and Ollie (Sarah Silverman), who are friends of Louise. Other friends, and frenemies, of the Belcher kids include the rebellious yet soft-hearted Zeke (Bobby Tisdale); valley girl Tammy (Jenny Slate) and her sidekick Jocelyn (Roberts); anxious nerd Darryl (Aziz Ansari); and the timid Regular-Sized Rudy (Brian Huskey). Mr. Frond (David Herman) is the always-stressed guidance counselor at their school. The kids often have run-ins with him.

Other recurring characters include Mort (Andy Kindler), the mortician who lives next door; the Belcher family's taciturn mailman Mike Wobbles (Tim Meadows); Linda's flighty sister Gayle (Megan Mullally); and the Belchers' wealthy, meddling and odd landlord, Calvin Fischoeder (Kevin Kline) and his bratty brother Felix (Zach Galifianakis). Sgt Bosco (Gary Cole) is a caustic and cantankerous police officer who helps and hinders the Belchers in their adventures. Bob is frequently antagonized by health inspector Hugo (Sam Seder), Linda's ex-fiancé who holds a grudge against Bob and constantly schemes to get the restaurant shut down, though his plans are often revealed to the Belchers by his easy-going assistant, Ron (Ron Lynch). Other characters include Linda's troubled friend Gretchen; Linda's insufferable parents; several recurring teachers and classmates of the Belcher children; Nat Kinkle, a family friend who helps them with odd jobs; and Marshmallow, a local who comes and goes as she pleases, answers to no one and is truly free.

Production

Creator Loren Bouchard said Bob's Burgers came about because Fox's animation brand centers mostly on family, but he also wanted to dabble in workplace comedy. In his original concept, the family were cannibals, but Fox executives convinced him to drop that aspect of the series. However, the idea was referenced in the pilot episode when Louise spreads a rumor that the burgers were made of humans. The series has generally been viewed as a spiritual successor to King of the Hill, which carried less emphasis on shock comedy and focused more on character-driven humor. Bob's Burgers executive producer Jim Dauterive worked on King of the Hill for nearly its entire run.

Proof of concept
Before the series aired, the team created a proof of concept so Fox knew what to expect if they bought the series. Bouchard, who was living in the Mission District of San Francisco at the time, hired some local artists to work on the pilot. These included Jay Howell, the character designer, and Sirron Norris, the background designer. The test animation featured Bob forgetting about his and Linda's wedding anniversary. This proof of concept eventually turned into the pilot episode. The pilot had the same synopsis as the official first episode (aired in 2011) but had both cosmetic and substantial differences.

The original pilot can be seen on the DVD release of the first season, released on April 17, 2012.

Development

Bob's Burgers first appeared on the development slate at Fox on August 6, 2009. On December 1, 2009, Fox ordered 13 episodes for the first season. On May 17, 2010, Fox placed the series on the primetime slate for the 2010–11 television season. A special preview aired on Thanksgiving on November 25, 2010.

Setting
The setting of the series is officially unnamed, though the town is referred informally among staff writers as "Seymour's Bay". Though informal, the name has appeared during the series: Bob is seen reading a newspaper titled "Seymour's Bay Times" in the season 11 episode "Y Tu Tina También". Series creator Loren Bouchard said early on that the series' location was an indeterminate Northeastern United States shore town (calling the setting a "semi-Springfield"), saying he drew inspiration from several areas (including San Francisco, whose Victorian architecture is mimicked on some of the buildings) for the town's physical appearance. As the series has proceeded, viewers and critics alike have come to a conclusion that the unnamed town is actually in southern New Jersey. The first such episode where the connection is at least attempted is the season three episode "It Snakes a Village,". Additional examples include character Tammy Larsen, who has a phone number with the area code 201, which belongs to the state (although not to the Jersey Shore area). An episode of Archer that featured a crossover between the two series has also furthered the narrative: in the episode "Fugue and Riffs," Sterling Archer is discovered to have been "flipping burgers at the Shore" for several weeks due to a case of amnesia where he believes he is Bob Belcher (Archer and Belcher are both voiced by H. Jon Benjamin).

Executive producers
Creator Loren Bouchard serves as the executive producer, alongside developer Jim Dauterive. They have served as executive producers since the first season. Dan Fybel and Rich Rinaldi were promoted to executive producers during season 6. Jim Dauterive later retired after the 9th production cycle and Norah Smith replaced him as co-showrunner in the 10th production cycle.

Writing
The current team of writers include Loren Bouchard, Scott Jacobson, Lizzie Molyneux-Logelin, Wendy Molyneux, Holly Schlesinger, Nora Smith, Steven Davis, Kelvin Yu, Dan Fybel, Rich Rinaldi, Jon Schroeder, Greg Thompson, and Katie Crown. Past writers on the series include Jim Dauterive, Kit Boss, Aron Abrams, and Mike Benner. H. Jon Benjamin, Rachel Hastings, Justin Hook, Dan Mintz, and Mike Olsen have also written or co-written episodes. After the writing has been completed, the voice actors read the script as written, but later are allowed to improvise lines. The editors and writer decide what improvised lines make the final cut.

Character design
Jay Howell acted as production designer for the series, creating the designs for the main cast, and acting as the blueprint for following designers. For the first nine seasons, character designs were provided by Dave Creek, who would go on to create designs for The Great North and Central Park before his death in 2021.

Voice cast

Bob's Burgers has six main cast members: H. Jon Benjamin as Bob Belcher, John Roberts as Linda Belcher, Dan Mintz as Tina Belcher, Eugene Mirman as Gene Belcher, Kristen Schaal as Louise Belcher, and Larry Murphy as Teddy.

At the Bob's Burgers Comic-Con 2018 panel, creator Loren Bouchard stated they were aware of the predominantly male gender imbalance amongst the voice actors, saying they would "strive to do better...to have balance." He stated one of the driving factors behind this was voice actor Kristen Schaal "reprimanding" them on the issue.

Hallmarks

Opening sequence
The ingredients of a hamburger fall into place on a white screen, and Bob's hands appear underneath to hold it. The other family members appear around him one at a time, beginning with Linda and ending with Louise. Linda puts her arm around Bob, Tina stands expressionless, Gene plays a sound effect on his keyboard, and Louise poses for the camera. The restaurant then materializes behind them and the neighboring businesses slide into place, with a funeral parlor at screen left, and the street slides into view in front. As the family stands in front of the restaurant (with Gene bouncing in place to the beat of the theme music), a "Grand Opening" banner is placed over the door, followed by a series of mishaps: a fire, an infestation of vermin, and a car knocking down a utility pole so that it smashes the front window of the restaurant. A new banner is hung up after each event: "Grand Re-Opening," "Grand Re-Re-Opening," and finally "Grand Re-Re-Re-Opening." The camera then zooms in on the cheese on the burger Bob is holding (and the restaurant sign during Seasons 1–2), and the view fades in to the start of the episode.

As with other Fox animated series, such as The Simpsons, the series employs the "changing element" running gag in its opening credits. The gag present on Bob's Burgers involves the store next to the restaurant, which has a new, humorously named occupant in every episode (such as "Betty's Machetes" in "Purple Rain-Union"). Additionally, beginning with Season 2, the pest control van in the sequence has the name of a different company on each episode; the van read "Rat's all Folks! Exterminators" on all episodes of Season 1. On certain episodes, an element is changed for a special night (a flash frame saying "HAPPY HALLOWEEN" was shown during the title sequence of "Fort Night"). 

In an article where the writers of the series rank the best 10 musical numbers of the first three seasons, series' creator and theme composer Loren Bouchard explains that the ukulele track in the theme is an edited version of the first recording he did, as well as the first take in 2008. According to Bouchard, if the EQ filter is taken off the original track, there is noise audible from the nightclub below the apartment he was living in when he recorded the theme.

Beginning in season 13, after the telephone pole crashes into the restaurant, an additional segment is added where the sinkhole opens up, referencing the events of The Bob's Burgers Movie.

Credits sequence
The credits sequence of Bob's Burgers often features the Belcher family at work. The scene is the kitchen of Bob's Burgers drawn with a black outline over a white background and the characters in full color, with the credits off to the right hand side. The sequence consists of Bob cooking a burger and Louise and Tina doing prep. Bob places the burger on the plate for Louise to give to Linda, who takes it from the window, and a few seconds later Gene walks through the kitchen wearing his burger costume.

Although the kitchen scene is still the main closing sequence the series uses, beginning in season two the producers began to use different elements from the series in the credits. Other times, the scene will play out as usual, but with something from the episode going on in the background.

Daily special
Every episode features one or more "Today's Special" burgers on a chalkboard on the wall behind the counter. The name of the special is usually a play on words that indicates what comes on the burger (ex.: "It's Fun to Eat at the rYe M C A Burger": Comes with Rye, Mustard, Cheese, and Avocado). Other "Special" burgers are also mentioned by the family without being written on their chalkboard. The joke is often that the play on words is overly complex or obscure, or simply a bad pun.

Broadcast syndication
Adult Swim acquired the cable syndication rights to air Bob's Burgers in 2013. Episodes generally air six nights a week on the network, sometimes seven. Adult Swim currently has rights to the first eight seasons of "Bob's Burgers" and recently began airing the episodes on Sundays.

20th Century Fox Television began distributing Bob's Burgers to local stations in 2015. The local stations had rights to the first eight seasons and also had rights to the ninth when the tenth season debuted on Fox. The series also premiered on September 26, 2016, on TBS and airs Mondays afternoons (along with American Dad!) and on Friday nights. As both are sister channels, TBS has the same rights as Cartoon Network/Adult Swim, and is airing the first eight seasons.

The series joined the FXX lineup on September 24, 2019, starting with the ninth season. In 2023, it will become the exclusive cable network for reruns, which means it will leave the Adult Swim and TBS lineups. This will not affect local syndication stations' rights to rerun the series.

Home media
The first season through the current season of the series are available on the iTunes Store for download & Hulu. The first 8 seasons are available from Amazon Video, and all twelve seasons are available on Disney + Star outside of the US. Only season 1 has a brick-and-mortar release, with special features and commentaries for every episode. All other seasons are manufactured-on-demand by Amazon.com, with little-to-no extras. These DVDs have been widely bootlegged, which can be identified by fragile plastic cases and silver-undersided discs. Bouchard has expressed on Twitter his disdain for the inferior picture quality of the official DVD-Rs and the ironically superior quality of the bootlegs.

Reception

Critical reception 
Bob's Burgers initially received mixed reviews for season 1, with a Metacritic score of 54 out of 100. However, by season 2 the ratings had reached a score of 78 out of 100, proving a rise in popularity with praises about its "daffy comedic momentum" and how it is "new and fresh." Rotten Tomatoes gave the first season a 73% score based on 41 reviews with an average rating of 6.1/10. The site's critical consensus states "A modestly immature workplace cartoon, not without potential, that needs to work on finding its rhythm." The Washington Post described the series as "pointlessly vulgar and derivatively dull," while Reuters stated that "It's unwise – and unnecessary – to launch an animated sitcom on Fox that appears intent to ape the vulgarity quotient of Family Guy." USA Today stated that "Bob's Burgers isn't very tasty," describing the comedy as just "lop[ing] along, stumbling from one tasteless moment to the next." The New York Times described the series as having "a lackadaisical vibe; its humor, no matter how anarchic, slides by in a deadpan monotone."

However, as the first season progressed and concluded and the second began, critics began giving the series praise. Rowan Kaiser of The A.V. Club has recalled, "...the show was amusing, yes, and there was certainly potential, but it took half a dozen episodes before it really began to meet that potential." Season 2 has a Metacritic score of 78 out 100, and a Rotten Tomatoes score of 100% based on 8 reviews.

Season 3 has a Rotten Tomatoes score of 88% based on 8 reviews, Season 4 has a score of 89% based on 9 reviews, season 5 has a score of 100% based on 12 reviews, and season 6 has 100% based on 10 reviews.

Entertainment Weekly gave the series an A− grade in its review, remarking that "a comedy this well done is very rare indeed." Ain't It Cool News called Bob's Burgers "perhaps the funniest half-hour currently airing on broadcast TV" in 2011. In its review, CNN called the series "wickedly funny" and said there are "too many highlights to list here." Speaking about the series during its second season, The A.V. Club reviewer Rowan Kaiser said: "After an uneven start, Bob's Burgers is becoming one of television's best comedies!" Since the debut of the second season of the series, the series' positive reception has increased.

The A.V. Club voted Bob's Burgers as the 10th best TV show of 2012, the 3rd best show of 2013, the 20th best show of 2014, and the 35th best show of 2015.

Ratings
After airing, the series became the highest-rated series premiere of the season and also finished 9th in the ratings for the week it aired. Despite this, the ratings went on a slide with ratings expert Bill Gorman of TV by the Numbers calling it a "toss up" for renewal before the series was renewed for a second season which premiered on March 11, 2012.

Awards and nominations

Other appearances

On January 6, 2011, some Fatburger locations were re-branded as Bob's Burgers for the day as a promotion. It also offered limited-time offers, such as a free burger giveaway, and a special, "The Thanks a Brunch Burger", on the menu until February 2011. There were also "Bob's Burgers" coupons offered for a free medium Fatburger special. Across the US, four locations were re-branded as Bob's Burgers: in California, New Jersey, Nevada, and Illinois. Two restaurant locations in California continued to use the Bob's Burgers appellation into 2016 which are located in La Puente, and Westminster, California.

The season 4 premiere episode of Archer features a crossover where the Belcher family is shown, but Bob is revealed to be Sterling Archer (also voiced by H. Jon Benjamin) in a fugue state. Archer has taken the place of Bob Belcher, with Bob inexplicably missing. The menu board touts the "Thomas Elphinstone Hambledurger, with Manning Coleslaw", a play on amnesiac secret agent Tommy Hambledon, a character in a series of novels by Manning Coles.

"Homerland", the season 25 premiere episode of The Simpsons, features a couch gag in which the Belcher family (skinned yellow according to the standard character coloring of the series) attend a 25th anniversary party in the Simpson family living room with the main characters of their fellow Animation Domination series. Bob made another cameo in the season 27 episode "The Girl Code", where a picture of him is shown, and explaining that the restaurant was boycotted by short people due to an offensive Burger of the Day. The series has also been referenced in season 30 of The Simpsons in a couch gag in the episode "My Way or the Highway to Heaven". Homer is stuck in the restaurant and the Belcher family does not understand what he wants. The original five cast members guest starred for the couch gag. "Treehouse of Horror XXXIII", the sixth episode of season 34 of The Simpsons featured Linda Belcher, with John Roberts reprising his role.

In the Family Guy episode "Space Cadet", the principal shows Peter and Lois a picture of Bob Belcher as a sign that Chris is doing poorly in his Advanced Art class. Peter mutters "I'm very embarrassed", and the principal replies "Well, someone should be". In "Boopa-dee Bappa-dee", Louise is one of many characters Stewie is turned into by Peter using a remote control. Bob's Burgers is also mentioned on "He's Bla-ack!" as one of the reasons why The Cleveland Show did not succeed. Bob makes a cameo appearance in the hour-long The Simpsons-Family Guy crossover "The Simpsons Guy". He appears on the same airplane as Homer and Peter in a cutaway about them being a greater team than the Air Force. Peter remarks to Homer that they have to carry Bob, and then Peter points to Cleveland's plane and says "We let that other guy try and look what happened". Cleveland, repeatedly saying "no", crashes in flames. This is a reference to the poor ratings of Bob's Burgers and the cancellation of The Cleveland Show. Bob's Burgers has been referenced two times in season 17 of Family Guy. In "Trump Guy", when Peter and Lois find out that Donald Trump is about to sexually harass Meg, Chris says that Bob's Burgers is on the TV. In "Trans-Fat", the Belcher family makes a cameo appearance in the Griffin family home, but only Bob has lines. In this cameo, H. Jon Benjamin voiced Bob, as he works on Family Guy.

In Aqua Teen Hunger Force, a character previously known as Dr. Eugene Mirman (played by himself) was renamed "Dr. Gene Belcher" in the episode "Hospice". The character's name was revealed on Aqua Teen Hunger Forces creator Dave Willis' Twitter account two hours before the episode. The character had been introduced in 2006, which was five years before Bob's Burgers aired.

Seattle rock band Sleater-Kinney collaborated with Bob's Burgers and its crew for their 2015 single "A New Wave", from the album No Cities to Love. The resultant music video featured the band, animated in the cartoon's style, performing for the Belcher children in Tina's bedroom.

In 2016, The Bob's Burgers Burger Book, edited by series creator Bouchard, was released. There are 75 burger recipes pulled from the fan-based blog "The Bob's Burger Experiment" based on the Specials of the Day that appear on the chalkboard menu in the series.

A sketch from the Robot Chicken episode "Boogie Bardstown in: No Need, I Have Coupons" has Bob Belcher compete on MasterChef Celebrity Showdown, along with SpongeBob SquarePants, Alfredo Linguini, and Jerome "Chef" McElroy. Bob has to cook with what he fears most: pigeons.

In other media

Film

On October 4, 2017, Fox announced that a Bob's Burgers Movie was in the works to be released on July 17, 2020. Creator Bouchard has said the movie will "scratch every itch the fans of the show have ever had," while being appealing to new audiences. On July 18, 2018, Bouchard said that the script has been submitted and accepted by the studio. The film will be a musical comedy and will involve Louise and her night light Kuchi Kopi inside her fantasy world as a minor subplot.

On November 17, 2019, it was briefly pulled from Fox's release schedule, but the following day it was back on the schedule. On April 3, 2020, Disney announced a delay to April 9, 2021, due to the COVID-19 pandemic.

On January 22, 2021, the film was delayed indefinitely, along with a few other 20th Century films.

In September 2021, the film received a new release date of May 27, 2022. Despite positive reviews from critics and audiences, the box office was below expectations, and it was released on HBO Max and Hulu on July 12, 2022.

Before the film's release, screenwriters Loren Bouchard and Nora Smith expressed interest in making a sequel film. The principal cast, including Benjamin, Schaal, Roberts, Mirman, and Mintz, have also expressed interest in a sequel on the film's commentary.

Comic book
A comic book series based on the series, published by Dynamite Entertainment, began its run in September 2014.

Pinball
A virtual pinball adaptation of the series was developed and released by Zen Studios in 2015, available as an add-on for the games Zen Pinball 2, Pinball FX 2 and Pinball FX 3, as well as a standalone, paid app on iOS and Android. This table is one of four tables featured in the "Balls of Glory" pinball pack produced as a result of Zen's partnership with Fox Digital Entertainment, and features 3D animated figures of the Belcher family.

See also
 Archer (season 4)
 "The Simpsons Guy"
 Central Park (TV series)
 The Great North

Notes

References

External links

 
 
 
 
 

 
American animated sitcoms
2010s American adult animated television series
2020s American adult animated television series
2010s American sitcoms
2020s American sitcoms
2010s American workplace comedy television series
2011 American television series debuts
2020s American workplace comedy television series
2010s American animated comedy television series
2020s American animated comedy television series
Animated adult television sitcoms
Animated television series about dysfunctional families
Annie Award winners
English-language television shows
Emmy Award-winning programs
Fictional restaurants
Fox Broadcasting Company original programming
Television series by 20th Century Fox Television
Television series by Fox Television Animation
Television series created by Loren Bouchard
Television series set in restaurants
Television shows adapted into films
Television shows featuring audio description
Television shows set in New Jersey
Television shows written by the Molyneux sisters